The  was the top professional wrestling title owned by the Wrestle-1 (W-1) promotion. In Japanese the title's name includes the katakana term for "championship", derived from the English language instead of the more common kanji term . The title also does not feature the word "Heavyweight" or any other weight class, indicating an open-weight status de facto.

Like most professional wrestling championships, the title is won as a result of a scripted match. There have been seventeen reigns shared among eleven wrestlers.

History

Championship tournament
On July 21, 2014, a full year after the start of the promotion, Wrestle-1 announced the creation of its first own title, the Wrestle-1 Championship. Previous Wrestle-1 events had featured matches for championships owned by other promotions like All Star Wrestling (ASW), European Wrestling Promotion (EWP), Pro Wrestling Zero1 and Total Nonstop Action Wrestling (TNA). It was announced that the inaugural champion would be determined in a sixteen-man single-elimination tournament taking place between September 21 and October 8. Wrestle-1's founder Keiji Mutoh quickly announced that he would not be taking part in the tournament. The tournament brackets were revealed on August 8, with the exception of two participants, who would be determined in qualifying matches on August 31. In the qualifying matches, Jiro Kuroshio defeated Andy Wu and Daiki Inaba defeated Koji Doi. The tournament featured only wrestlers officially signed to Wrestle-1 and none of the freelancers or outside wrestlers working regularly for the promotion. Pro Wrestling Zero1's reigning World Heavyweight Champion Masakatsu Funaki announced he was looking to defend his title throughout the tournament and unifying it with the Wrestle-1 Championship. However, just before the start of the tournament on September 19, Funaki lost the World Heavyweight Championship. The Wrestle-1 Championship belt was unveiled at a press conference on September 17. The first two rounds of the tournament were held over three shows between September 21 and 23 and saw Kai, Masakatsu Funaki, Masayuki Kono and Shuji Kondo advance to set up the two semifinal matches for October 8. In the semifinals, Kai and Kono were victorious over Kondo and Funaki, respectively, setting up a final match later that same day, where Kono defeated Kai to win the tournament and become the inaugural Wrestle-1 Champion.

Title history

Combined reigns

Belt design
The standard Championship belt has three plates on a black leather strap.

References

External links
Official title history at W-1.co.jp 
Title history at Wrestling-Titles.com

Wrestle-1 championships
Openweight wrestling championships